Amethysa intermedia is a species of ulidiidae or picture-winged fly in the genus Amethysa of the family Ulidiidae.

References

Amethysa